was a Japanese Nippon Professional Baseball third baseman and second baseman. He played for the Osaka/Hanshin Tigers from 1953 to 1967.

External links
Career statistics and player information from Baseball-Reference

References

1934 births
2021 deaths
Japanese baseball players
Nippon Professional Baseball infielders
Osaka Tigers players
Hanshin Tigers players
Baseball people from Okayama Prefecture